The British Soap Award for Best Newcomer is an award presented annually by the British Soap Awards. Unlike awards that are voted for by the general public such as Best Actress, Best Actor, Best British Soap and Best Leading Performer, the award is voted for by a panel, like the award for Villain of the Year. EastEnders is the most awarded soap in the category, with nine wins. Emmerdale is the only current soap not to have won a Best Newcomer award; the defunct soaps that did not win are Family Affairs and Night and Day. The award is currently held by Ross Boatman, who plays Harvey Monroe in EastEnders.

Awards and nominees

Wins by soap

References

Soap opera awards
The British Soap Awards